Hear No Evil may refer to:

 Part of the adage See no evil, hear no evil, speak no evil
 Hear No Evil (1982 film), a 1982 made-for-TV film
 Hear No Evil (1993 film), a 1993 film starring Marlee Matlin and Martin Sheen
 Hear No Evil (2014 film), a 2014 film starring Richard T. Jones, Jill Marie Jones, and Jahnee Wallace
 Hear No Evil (album), a 1988 album by composer Bill Laswell
 Hear No Evil (Lord EP), a 2008 EP by Australian heavy metal band Lord
 "Hear No Evil" (The Flash), an episode of The Flash
 Hear No Evil (Young Thug EP), a 2018 EP by American rapper Young Thug